The Doyle Aero O-2 Oriole or Doyle O-2 was a parasol wing aircraft.

Development
Brothers Harvey and Wilson Doyle designed the Vulcan American Moth Monoplane in 1928. They left the Vulcan Aircraft Company after a disagreement with its founder and moved to Baltimore Maryland with backing from Lawyer Charles Baldwin. They set to work on a new monoplane, with test pilot Otto Melamet flying the prototype O-2 Oriole on 15 October 1928.

Design
The O-2 is a parasol wing, conventional landing gear, strut-braced, tandem-seat, open cockpit, sport aircraft. The fuselage is constructed of welded steel tubing with an aluminum turtledeck and belly covers, covered with fabric. The wing uses wooden spars and ribs with the fuel tanks the wing roots. A small door provided access to the front seat.

Operational history
Serial number 2 and 3 were wrecked en route to the All-American airshow in Detroit to demonstrate the aircraft. Serial number 5 was rushed to completion to be trucked to the event. The same aircraft was restored in 1987 and still is airworthy with a private owner.

Variants
O-3 Oriole
O-2 modified with a  Chevrolair D-4 engine

Specifications (O-2 Oriole)

See also

References

Parasol-wing aircraft
Single-engined tractor aircraft
Aircraft first flown in 1928
1920s United States sport aircraft